"Pretender" is a song recorded by Japanese band Official Hige Dandism, released on May 15, 2019, through Pony Canyon in physical single format to serve as the theme song of the 2019 film The Confidence Man JP. Upon release, it was a commercial success, and spent seven weeks at number one on the Billboard Japan Hot 100 and thirty-four weeks at number one on the streaming chart, breaking the record held by "Marigold".

Composition and lyrics
The song is written by vocalist/pianist Satoshi Fujihara and composed in the key of A-flat major and is set in time signature of common time with a tempo of 92 BPM. "Pretender" features a piano, guitar, electric bass, and drums. Begins with melodic guitar arpeggios, the song is described as a sad love song about a man who thinks he is not worthy to fall in love with the woman he likes, and saying 'goodbye' as an expression of giving up.

Music video
The video of "Pretender" was released on April 16, 2019 and directed by Takuto Shimpo. It was filmed in Taipei, showing the band performing with the night view of Taipei as the background, while theatrical scenes of local Taiwanese models and actors are inter-cut in between. On May 22, 2019, the video for the acoustic version of the song was released. It was directed by Yoshiaki Muto, features the band performing with the night view of Tokyo as the background. As of May 2022, "Pretender" has over 400 million views on YouTube, became their most viewed music video, while the acoustic version has over 7 million views on YouTube.

Track listing

Personnel
Words, music and programming: Satoshi Fujihara
Arrangement: Official Hige Dandism
Vocal and piano: Satoshi Fujihara
Guitar and chorus: Daisuke Ozasa
Bass and chorus: Makoto Narazaki
Drums and chorus: Masaki Matsuura
Guitar technician: Tatsuya Mochiduki (Innovator Associates Inc.) 
Drums technician: Genki Wada
Recorded and mixed by Masahito Komori
Mastered by Ted Jensen (at Sterling Sound)

Charts

Weekly charts

Year-end charts

Certifications

Awards

Covers
 Peaky P-key did a cover of the song for the game D4DJ Groovy Mix.
 In 2019, Pentatonix covered the song on their PTX Japan 5th Anniversary Greatest Hits album.

References

2019 singles
2019 songs
Billboard Japan Hot 100 number-one singles
Japanese film songs
Official Hige Dandism songs
Pony Canyon singles